Savignano sul Rubicone is a comune (municipality) in the Province of Forlì-Cesena in the Italian region Emilia-Romagna, located about  southeast of Bologna and about  southeast of Forlì.

The comune takes its name from the Rubicon, famous for Julius Caesar's historic crossing.  A combination of natural and man-made changes caused the original Rubicon to change course repeatedly since then.  For centuries the exact location of the original river was unknown.  In 1991, the Fiumicino, a river which crosses Savignano sul Rubicone, was identified as the most likely location for the original Rubicon.  Prior to that the region was called Savignano di Romagna.

Twin towns
 Nizza Monferrato, Italy
 Vals-les-Bains, France

References

External links

 

Cities and towns in Emilia-Romagna